The 1988–89 I-Divisioona season was the 15th season of the I-Divisioona, the second level of Finnish ice hockey. 12 teams participated in the league, and JoKP Joensuu won the championship. JoKP Joensuu and Jokerit Helsinki qualified for the promotion/relegation round of the SM-liiga.

Regular season

External links
 Season on hockeyarchives.info

2
Fin
I-Divisioona seasons